Soldaterkammerater rykker ud is a 1959 Danish comedy film directed by Sven Methling and starring Louis Miehe-Renard.

Cast
 Louis Miehe-Renard – Knud Petersen (616)
 Ebbe Langberg – Peter 'Ras' Rasmussen (613)
 Paul Hagen – Henrik Didriksen (617)
 Preben Kaas – Ole Sørensen (615)
 Klaus Pagh – Holger Schwanenkopf (614)
 Ole Dixon – Bolleå (612)
 Svend Johansen – Viggo Clausen (611)
 Carl Ottosen – 1st Sergeant Vældegaard (Lillebror)
 Vera Stricker – Nora Didriksen
 Annie Birgit Garde – Karen
 Vivi Bach – Inger (as Vivi Bak)
 Mimi Heinrich – Mette
 Dirch Passer – Guard og Conferencier
 Kjeld Petersen – The Military Doctor
 Bjørn Puggaard-Müller – Captain Berg

References

External links

1959 films
Danish comedy films
1950s Danish-language films
1959 comedy films
Films directed by Sven Methling